The 2013 Big South Conference men's soccer tournament will be the 30th edition of the tournament. Held from Nov. 14-17, it will determine the Big South Conference champion, and the automatic berth into the 2013 NCAA Division I Men's Soccer Championship. The Winthrop Eagles are the defending men's soccer champions.

Qualification

Bracket

Schedule

Quarterfinals

Semifinals

Big South Championship

See also 
 Big South Conference
 2013 Big South Conference men's soccer season
 2013 NCAA Division I men's soccer season
 2013 NCAA Division I Men's Soccer Championship

References 

2013
Big South Conference Men's Soccer Tournament
Big South Conference Men's Soccer Tournament